Warren Dean (1932, Passaic, New Jersey – 21 May 1994, Santiago de Chile) was a prize-winning  historian of modern Latin America, specializing in Brazil as well as environmental history. Following his  accidental death by asphyxiation due to a defective gas line in his rented apartment,  the Warren Dean Prize was established by the Conference on Latin American History in 1995.

Early life
Dean was born in New Jersey and moved with his family to Miami when he was 14 years old. He attended University of Miami, completed the Reserve Officer Training Corps program and was commissioned a second lieutenant in the U.S. Air Force. During the Korean War he was an air traffic controller in Maine.  Following military service, he entered the program in Latin American history at University of Florida, completing his dissertation in 1964 entitled “São Paulo's industrial élite, 1890–1960.”

Academic career
Following completion of his doctorate, he taught at University of Texas, Austin (1965–70) and moved to New York University, where he remained until his death. His first monograph, The Industrialization of São Paulo (1969), was based on his dissertation work; his second monograph Rio Claro: A Brazilian Plantation System, 1820–1920 (1976) received Honorable Mention for the Conference on Latin American History’s Bolton Prize, “awarded for the best book in English on any significant aspect of Latin American History that is published anywhere during the imprint year previous to the year of the award.”. His final monograph on environmental history With Broadax and Firebrand: The Destruction of the Brazilian Atlantic Forest (1995) won the Bolton-Johnson Prize posthumously. He was awarded a John Simon Guggenheim Foundation Fellowship in 1980, and became a member  of the Royal Geographical Society.  He served on the editorial board of the Hispanic American Historical Review.

Dean organized the American Committee for Information on Brazil, during the military dictatorship in that country, documenting and denouncing the use of torture.

References

Latin Americanists
Brazilianists
Historians of Latin America
Historians of Brazil
University of Miami alumni
University of Florida alumni
University of Texas faculty
New York University faculty
1932 births
1994 deaths
Deaths from asphyxiation
Environmental historians